There was a period of revolutions and interventions in Hungary between 1918 and 1920. The First Hungarian Republic was founded from the ruins of the Austro-Hungarian Empire by Mihály Károlyi during the Aster Revolution in 1918, at the end of World War I. In March 1919, the republic was overturned by another revolution, and the Hungarian Soviet Republic  was created. Unresolved conflicts led to wars between Hungary and its neighbor states (Kingdom of Romania, Kingdom of Serbs, Croats and Slovenes and the evolving Czechoslovakia) in 1919. The Hungarian Soviet Republic ceased to exist after the Romanian occupation. The 1920 Treaty of Trianon in Versailles created the Kingdom of Hungary.

Background

With the volatile and politically unstable atmosphere of Central Europe in the inter-war years, the establishment of independent governments of the former Austro-Hungarian Empire in November 1918 would see the struggle to regain territories of the former empire. However, the Hungarian President of the Hungarian Democratic Republic, Mihály Károlyi, resigned within four months (on March 20, 1919) in favor of Béla Kun, a pro-Bolshevik who had been sent by Lenin, quickly seizing power and establishing a revolutionary government.

Military conflicts

During the war, the Hungarian red army fought separate battles against troops from Czechoslovakia and Romania, while France was also highly involved diplomatically in the conflicts, too. By its final stage, more than 120,000 troops on both sides were involved.

Appealing to Hungarians with promises of regaining the land lost to neighboring countries within a week of his rise to power, Kun declared war upon Czechoslovakia as Hungarian forces invaded Upper Hungary on May 20, capturing southern territories within weeks. In the face of advancing Hungarian troops, the Allies began to put pressure on the Hungarian government and, within three weeks with Kun's assurances of Russian support failing to materialize, Hungary was forced to withdraw from the just proclaimed Slovak Soviet Republic after having been given an ultimatum by France, together with a guarantee that Romanian forces would retreat from Tiszántúl.

The Romanians disregarded the guarantees of the French leadership and remained on the eastern banks of the Tisza River. The Hungarian government claiming to impose the will of the Allies on Romania, and seeing that diplomatic solutions would not compel them, resolved to clear the threat by military force once and for all. They planned to throw the Romanians out of Tiszántúl, destroy the Romanian army, and even retake Transylvania.  However, the Hungarian offensive was defeated by the Romanian army, and despite all previous pledges, agreements, and guarantees, the Romanians crossed the river Tisza and quickly advanced towards Budapest. The Hungarian capital fell on August 4, only three days before Kun's escape to Vienna. The destruction of the Hungarian Soviet Republic and the Romanian occupation of parts of Hungary proper, including its capital Budapest in August 1919, ended the war. Romanian troops withdrew from Hungary in March 1920, after seizing large amounts of goods from Hungary, which they regarded as war reparations.

Consequences

After the Hungarian–Romanian War, the country was totally defeated.

In the name of what they considered to be war reparations, the Romanian government requested the delivery of 50% of the country's rolling stock, 30% of its livestock, twenty thousand carloads of fodder, and even assessed payment for their expenditures.

By the beginning of 1920, they had seized much from Hungary, including food, trucks, locomotives and railroad cars, factory equipment, even the telephones and typewriters from government offices; the Hungarians regarded these Romanian seizures as looting. The Romanian occupation lasted for nearly six months.

After the Romanian occupation, Miklós Horthy's "White Terror" was carried out in response to the previous "Red Terror". The Hungarians had to cede all war materials, except those weapons necessary for the troops under Horthy's command.

See also
Aftermath of World War I
Hungarian Soviet Republic
Miklós Horthy
Austria-Hungary
Béla Kun

References

External links
http://www.onwar.com/aced/data/charlie/czechhungary1919.htm

20th-century revolutions
Communism in Hungary
Communist revolutions
Revolutions in Hungary
Wars involving Czechoslovakia
Wars involving France
Wars involving Hungary
Wars involving Romania
Proxy wars
Revolutions of 1917–1923
Subsidiary conflicts of World War I
Wars between the Czech Republic and Hungary